Dutch DJ Junkie XL has released six studio albums and multiple soundtrack albums.

Albums

Studio albums

Singles

As lead artist

As featured performer

Soundtracks

Other album appearances

Soundtracks

Remixes 

 1997 Fear Factory - Burn
 1997 Fear Factory - Cyberdyne
 1997 Fear Factory - Refueled
 1997 Fear Factory - Genetic Blueprint
 1997 Fear Factory - Bionic Chronic
 1997 Dog Eat Dog - Step Right In
 1997 Chris Hinze - Peace Minds 
 1998 3 Colours Red - Paralyse
 1998 Project Pitchfork - Carnival
 1998 (HED) P.E. - Serpent Boy
 1998 The Trammps - Disco Inferno
 1999 Fear Factory - Cars
 1999 Fear Factory - Descent
 1999 Kong - "Yèllow Mystiç"
 1999 Soulfly - Umbabarauma
 1999 Tanith - T.A.N.I.T.H.
 2000 DJ Sandy vs. Housetrap - Overdrive
 2000 Shanks & Bigfoot - Sing-A-Long
 2000 Praga Khan - Power of The Flower
 2000 Junkie XL - Zerotonine
 2000 Way Out West - UB Devoid
 2001 Ayumi Hamasaki - Vogue
 2001 Conjure One - Redemption
 2002 Natalie Imbruglia - Beauty On The Fire
 2002 Elvis Presley - A Little Less Conversation
 2002 Fischerspooner - Emerge
 2002 Rammstein - Feuer frei!
 2003 Conjure One - Center of The Sun
 2003 Syntax - Pray
 2003 Dave Gahan - Dirty Sticky Floors
 2003 Infusion - Legacy
 2003 BT - Somnambulist (Simply Being Loved)
 2003 Fear Factory - Edgecrusher
 2003 Junkie XL - Between These Walls
 2003 Junkie XL - Angels
 2003 Mylène Farmer - XXL
 2003 Scissor Sisters - Mary
 2004 Michael Bublé - Spider-Man Theme & "Swag"

 2004 Britney Spears - Outrageous
 2004 Beastie Boys - (You Gotta) Fight for Your Right (To Party!)
 2004 Ryukyu Underground - Seragaki
 2004 Sarah McLachlan - World on Fire
 2005 Tiësto - UR 
 2005 Britney Spears - And Then We Kiss
 2005 The Crew-Cuts - Sh-Boom
 2005 The Go-Go's - Our Lips Are Sealed
 2005 Culture Club - I'll Tumble 4 Ya
 2006 Niyaz - Dilruba
 2006 Mark Mothersbaugh - The Sims Theme
 2006 Coldplay - Talk
 2006 Scissor Sisters - Land of a Thousand Words
 2006 Yonderboi - People Always Talk About The Weather
 2006 UNKLE - Burn My Shadow
 2007 melody. - Feel The Rush
 2007 Fatboy Slim - Weapon of Choice
 2007 Avril Lavigne - Girlfriend
 2007 Junkie XL - Colossus of Rhodes
 2007 Justin Timberlake - What Goes Around...
 2007 Junkie XL - More
 2007 Britney Spears - Gimme More
 2007 Tom Jones - Feels Like Music
 2008 Junkie XL - Cities in Dust
 2008 Junkie XL - Not Enough
 2008 Madonna and Justin Timberlake - 4 Minutes
 2008 Eagles of Death Metal - Don't Speak
 2008 Jape - I Was A Man
 2008 Lisa Miskovsky - Still Alive
 2009 Nami Tamaki - Believe
 2010 Steve Jablonsky - The Sims Theme
 2010 Hans Zimmer - Inception
 2010 Daft Punk - The Grid
 2012 Hans Zimmer - Bombers Over Ibiza
|
|}

References 

Discographies of Dutch artists